Kay Iverson was a Danish-born Canadian ice hockey coach who led Marquette to two intercollegiate championships.

Career
Iverson followed his older brother Emil into the coaching ranks of college hockey when he became the third head coach for the program at Wisconsin in 1924. After a poor first season, the Badgers produced the team's first winning record in 1926. In the offseason, Iverson left Wisconsin and made the short trek to Milwaukee to take over at Marquette. His first recruiting class included three Canadian players; Pudge MacKenzie, Don McFadyen, and George McTeer, nicknamed "the three Macs". Those players formed the nucleus of the team and helped the Blue and Gold produce its first winning season.

McTeer left after just one year, but the other two remained. Iverson built the program around their talents and the team went nearly undefeated in 1928, winning the western intercollegiate championship after claiming the season series over Minnesota. After finishing in second place the following year, Marquette returned to the top of the field in 1930, managing to defeat Harvard during the year.

Iverson left Marquette after the second championship and doesn't appear to have continued coaching afterwards.

Head coaching record

References

Year of birth missing
Year of death missing
Canadian ice hockey coaches
Wisconsin Badgers men's ice hockey coaches
Danish ice hockey people
Sportspeople from Copenhagen
Marquette Golden Eagles men's ice hockey coaches